23 Leonis Minoris (23 LMi) is a solitary, bluish-white hued star located in the northern constellation Leo Minor. It is positioned 7° south and 11" west from β Leonis Minoris. It is rarely called 7 H. Leonis Minoris, which is its Hevelius designation.

The object has an apparent magnitude of 5.49, allowing it to be faintly visible to the naked eye. At its current distance, the star's brightness is diminished by a tenth of a magnitude due to interstellar dust. 23 LMi's kinematics matches that of the Hyades moving group and it is considered a probable member.

23 LMi was catalogued as a chemically peculiar star with a stellar classification of A0 Vpn due to a lack of magnesium in its spectrum by Helmut Abt and Nidia Irene Morrell. However, A.P. Cowley and colleagues instead listed it as an ordinary A-type main-sequence star with nebulous absorption lines as a result of rapid rotation, with the class being A0 Vn. It has 2.55 times the mass of the Sun and is said to be 285 million years old, having completed 60.8% of its main sequence lifetime.

References

A-type main-sequence stars
Hyades Stream
Leo Minor
Leonis Minoris, 23
BD+30 01981
088960
050303
4024
High-proper-motion stars